Leslie Gladys Williams is an Australian politician and a member of the New South Wales Legislative Assembly representing Port Macquarie since 2011 for the Nationals until switching to the Liberal Party in 2020. Williams has served as the New South Wales Assistant Minister for Education, Minister for Aboriginal Affairs, and Minister for Early Childhood Education from 2 April 2015 until 23 January 2017 when she was replaced in Gladys Berejiklian's cabinet by Sarah Mitchell. Since 7 May 2019, she has served as Deputy Speaker of the Legislative Assembly.

Background
Leslie Gladys Williams was born on Kangaroo Island, South Australia. Williams' early career was in teaching in regional South Australia and she completed a short-term assignment as chief executive officer of the Northern Territory division of the Sudden Infant Death Association. In 2000, Williams and her husband commenced ownership of the post office at Lake Cathie, New South Wales, and now operate a mail delivery service. At the same time, she completed a degree in nursing, and worked in the medical and palliative care ward at the Port Macquarie Base Hospital.

Williams' community involvement includes membership of the Rotary Club of Laurieton, being a director of both the Hastings Men's Shed and the Suicide Prevention Network, and she is a volunteer for various organisations, including the Cancer Council of New South Wales and the Salvation Army.

Political career
Williams' first tilt at public office was at the 2007 State Election where she was defeated by Nationals-turned-independent member, Rob Oakeshott. Williams gained a 3.4 percent swing towards the Nationals. When Oakshott resigned the seat to contest a by-election in the Federal parliament, Williams again contested the seat against Oakshott's staffer and independent candidate, Peter Besseling. Besseling won the by-election despite a large 23.7-point swing towards Williams and the Nationals.

Williams again contested Port Macquarie at the next general election, the 2011 state election, and won against Besseling with a two-party-preferred swing of 10.9 points to the Nationals, giving Williams a 6.4-point margin against her independent opponent. She actually won enough votes on the first count to reclaim the seat for the Nationals without the need for preferences.

Her victory was put down in part to anger at Besseling's association with Oakeshott, who kept federal Labor in office as a minority government after the 2010 federal election. Port Macquarie has long been National heartland, and had been a comfortably safe National seat in "traditional" two-party matchups with Labor even when Oakeshott held it without serious difficulty as an independent.

Following the 2015 state election, Williams was sworn in as the Assistant Minister for Education, the Minister for Aboriginal Affairs, and the Minister for Early Childhood Education in the second Baird government.

On 20 September 2020, Williams announced she had resigned from the National Party and intended to defect to the Liberal Party, citing the "reckless and unreasonable behaviour" of the Nationals leader John Barilaro in threatening to move the party to the crossbench. She became a Liberal Party member later that night.

Personal life
Williams is the cousin of former South Australian Deputy Premier Vickie Chapman, and niece of Vickie's father Ted Chapman.

References

External links
National Party – Leslie Williams, Candidate for Port Macquarie

 

Living people
Year of birth missing (living people)
Members of the New South Wales Legislative Assembly
Liberal Party of Australia members of the Parliament of New South Wales
Place of birth missing (living people)
People from Kangaroo Island, South Australia
21st-century Australian politicians
21st-century Australian women politicians
Women members of the New South Wales Legislative Assembly
Women legislative deputy speakers
Deputy and Assistant Speakers of the New South Wales Legislative Assembly